Unnatural Selection may refer to:

Literature

Fiction 
 Unnatural Selection (Buffy novel), a 1999 novel based on the TV series Buffy the Vampire Slayer
 Unnatural Selection, a 2006 Gideon Oliver novel by Aaron Elkins
 Saurians: Unnatural Selection, a 2002 CrossGen comic book

Nonfiction 
 Unnatural Selection: Why the Geeks Will Inherit the Earth, a 2013 book by Mark Roeder
 Unnatural Selection: Choosing Boys Over Girls, and the Consequences of a World Full of Men, a 2011 book by Mara Hvistendahl
 Unnatural Selection, a 2018 illustrated natural history book by Katrina van Grouw

Music 
 Unnatural Selection (Flotsam and Jetsam album), 1999
 Unnatural Selection (Havok album) or the title song, 2013
 "Unnatural Selection", a song by Ayreon from 01011001, 2008
 "Unnatural Selection", a song by Muse from The Resistance, 2009

Television 
 Unnatural Selection (TV series), a 2019 Netflix documentary series
 "Unnatural Selection" (The Outer Limits), an episode
 "Unnatural Selection" (Star Trek: The Next Generation), an episode
 "Unnatural Selection" (Stargate SG-1), an episode

Other uses 
 Unnatural Selection (film), a 1996 British direct-to-video film in the P.R.O.B.E. series
 Unnatural Selection (video game), a 1993 video game by Maxis

See also
 Natural selection
 Natural Selection (disambiguation)
 Selective breeding